This is a list of historic institutions for mentally disabled people.

Canada
Child and Parent Resource Institute, London, Ontario

United States
Southbury Training School, 1930s, Connecticut
Iowa Institution for Feeble-Minded Children, 1876, Iowa
Pineland Farms, 1908, Maine
Crownsville Hospital Center, Maryland
Institution for Idiots, Barre, Massachusetts, 1848 founded 1848 by Dr. Hervey B. Wilbur 
Massachusetts School for the Feeble-Minded, 1848, founded by Samuel Gridley Howe
The School for the Feeble-minded, Waltham, Massachusetts
Walter E. Fernald State School, 1848, Massachusetts
The School for the Feeble-minded, Laconia, New Hampshire
Brookfield Schools, southern New Jersey
E. R. Johnstone Training and Research Center, Bordentown, New Jersey
Vineland Training School, 1888, Vineland, New Jersey, founded by Reverend S. Olin Garrison
East Aurora Colony House, New York
The Idiot School, 1866, Randalls Island House of Refuge, East River, New York 
Newark State School, 1878, New York
Private Institute for Imbeciles, 1856, Brooklyn, New York, founded by James B. Richards
St. Josephs Protectory, West Seneca, New York
Syracuse State School, 1853, New York
Willowbrook State School, Staten Island, New York
Fairview Training Center, 1908, Oregon
Elwyn Training School, Media, Pennsylvania, founded 1852 by Alfred L. Elwyn 
Pennhurst State School, Pennsylvania
Grafton State School, Now Life Skills and Transition Center, North Dakota
School for the Feeble-Minded and Colony for Epileptics, Faribault, Minnesota

Mentally disabled

Mentally disabled